Rutovu is a small town and seat of the Commune of Rutovu in Bururi Province in southern Burundi. It lies 37.1 kilometres by road to the northeast of Bururi.

People

The first three presidents of Burundi were born in Rutovu.

Tourism
Rutovu receives some tourism due to nearby Mount Kikizi, known as the most distant source of the White Nile.

References

External links
Satellite map at Maplandia.com

Populated places in Bururi Province